Cheiracanthium annulipes is a spider species found in Spain, Egypt and Israel.

References 

annulipes
Spiders of Europe
Spiders of Africa
Arthropods of Egypt
Spiders of Asia
Spiders described in 1872